"Sweet Understanding Love" is a 1973 hit song recorded by the Four Tops for the ABC Records label. The song was the second of three single releases from their sixteenth studio album, Main Street People. The title track of the LP is on the B-side of the 45. "Sweet Understanding Love" was placed on their 1991 compilation album Ain't No Woman (Like the One I've Got). It was also included on their album Anthology: 50th Anniversary (2004).

Background
The song was written by R. Benson, Valaida  Benson and I. Hunter.It marked the end of a 10-year run of American Top 40 hits by the group. They would return eight years later when they scored a major comeback hit, "When She Was My Girl".

Charts
The song reached number 10 on the American R&B chart, number 33 on the American Billboard chart in 1973, and number 30 on the Cash Box Top 100. It reached number 29 in the UK.

References

External links
 Lyrics of this song
 

1973 songs
1973 singles
Four Tops songs
Songs written by Dennis Lambert
Songs written by Brian Potter (musician)
ABC Records singles